Pavlo Cherepin (born September 30, 1981 in the Ukrainian SSR of the Soviet Union – in present-day Ukraine) is a Ukrainian journalist, TV commentator, rally co-driver, vice-champion of Ukraine (2010), and winner of two rounds of the World Rally Championship in WRC-2 (2014).

Career

Career outside motorsport 
Pavlo Cherepin's career from the beginning was closely associated with the sport. From 2001 to 2007 he worked as a journalist and TV commentator, creator of the program Our football, and commentator for the UEFA Champions League, Ukrainian Premier League, UEFA European Championship and FIFA World Cup matches on Ukrainian Inter, Ukrayina, and Pershyi Natsionalnyi TV channels. In 2002 he created the project "ua-football", which became one of the leading online sports media in Ukraine.

From 2005 to 2007, Pavlo Cherepin was Marketing Director of the Professional Football League of Ukraine. Since 2008, he is a business consultant in the field of sports marketing and online media.

Amateur rally 
Relationship with motorsports for Pavlo Cherepin started in amateur rally. In 2007 and 2008 he took part in several rounds of the FAU Rally Cup for production vehicles, using his own Subaru Impreza as the first pilot. Cherepin's professional debut occurred at one of the most popular Ukrainian competitions, the Yalta Rally. The crew of Gennady Sanchenko and Pavlo Cherepin led the entire race distance, and, according to Pavlo, during the race they swapped the driver's and co-driver's role several times. However, it was not more than an experiment; Cherepin's serious career as a rally co-driver began three years later.

Professional rally

Ukrainian Rally Championship 
Early winter 2010, when Oleksandr Saliuk and Adrian Aftanaziv stopped their collaboration, the current champion of Ukraine started looking for a new partner. In search of a navigator Saliuk occasionally performed with Oleksiy Mochanov (WRC Rally of Turkey) and Ivan Herman (Rally Bukovina), but soon started cooperation with Pavlo Cherepin.

The crew's first start ended with failure: just before the finish of the Chumatskyy Shlyakh Rally, the red Mitsubishi Lancer Evo lost the pace and couldn't come back on the road. But it was the only failure of the 2010 season – after that the crew won the Mariupol, Galicia and Kyivska Rus rallies, and before the final round of the championship became the main contender for the title. Finally Saliuk and Cherepin became 7th at the Yalta Rally, and Saliuk won the title among the drivers. At the same time Cherepin, who started the season from the second event, didn't collect the needed points and became only vice-champion of Ukraine among the co-drivers.

The same year, the crew made its debut in foreign competitions, taking part in two rounds of the Latvian championship, as well as in the Estonian Rally Saaremaa. By the end of the Rally Latvia Saliuk and Cherepin ranked second in class N4, and it remains the best result for Ukrainian crews in Latvian rally competitions.

The next Ukrainian championship, unlike the previous one, began successfully for the crew - with a convincing victory in the Chumatskyy Shlyakh Rally. However, soon after Saliuk got a shoulder injury playing squash, so the crew passed the following two rounds of the championship. After an enforced break Saliuk and Cherepin started in the Kyivska Rus rally, but retired early. As a result, in the final standings of the 2011 Ukrainian championship Pavlo Cherepin only obtained 10th position.

After that, the majority of Cherepin's starts were at foreign competitions. In Ukrainian rallies he appeared only once - with Oleksiy Kikireshko at the 2012 Galicia rally where the crew took 4th place overall.

Intercontinental Rally Challenge 
The highlight of Cherepin's career was participating in the Intercontinental Rally Challenge. Saliuk and Cherepin started in IRC twice with the best result of 7th place at Rallye Açores. But after the next race, Rally Islas Canarias, both drivers decided to stop their collaboration.

World Rally Championship 
Pavlo Cherepin debuted in the World Rally Championship along with Oleksandr Saliuk in 2011. As a part of Mentos Ascania Racing the crew took part in six rounds of the Production World Rally Championship in Sweden, Portugal, Finland, Australia, Spain and Wales. Only once during the season the crew didn't finish the rally, rolling over the roof several times after a failed jump in Finland. The best result was in Australia, where the Ukrainian tandem took eighth place overall and third in Production WRC.

After the break with Saliuk, Pavlo Cherepin started in the WRC episodically for two years. His drivers – Oleksiy Kikireshko and Oleksiy Tamrazov – rarely achieved high results, in most cases, ending the race early. The only honorable mention for Cherepin in this period was the 4th place in the WRC2 at the Acropolis Rally with Tamrazov.

Quite different events unfolded from the beginning of 2014, when Cherepin received an invitation to become a co-driver of the talented Ukrainian driver Yuriy Protasov. At the first start in Rally Monte-Carlo Protasov and Cherepin won in the WRC2 category. After two months they repeated it at Rally Mexico and in the middle of the season the crew got the status of season favorite.

Season 2015 started for Protasov and Cherepin with a brand new car – Citroen DS3 WRC prepared by D-Max Racing. The debut race did not go the best way, and after that the crew changed their car back to a Ford Fiesta RS WRC. The second WRC round in Sweden became historic for Yuriy and Pavlo: setting the best time overall on special stage 6, they become the first Ukrainian crew able to make it.

At the next rounds of Championship in Mexico and Argentina Protasov and Cherepin returned to the Ford Fiesta RRC. Leading the WRC 2 both times, the crew managed only to finish outside the top three due to technical problems (engine overheating in Mexico and broken suspension in Argentina). Luck came back in Italy where the crew finally won the WRC 2 round with the famous Paolo Andreucci second and Jan Kopecky third. Spirited by this result, the crew became 3rd in Finland and Germany and 2nd in Australia, breaking their personal record with four podiums in a row.

Career results

WRC results

* Season still in progress.

PWRC results

WRC 2 results

Podiums

Interesting facts
Pavlo Cherepin is the first Ukrainian co-driver to win a single special stage in WRC overall – it happened on SS6 of the 2015 Rally Sweden.

Pavlo Cherepin is the only Ukrainian co-driver who scored points in the World Rally Championship. This achievement is hard to repeat because Cherepin gained the points with two different drivers – Oleksandr Saliuk Jr. and Yuriy Protasov.

References

1981 births
Living people
Sportspeople from Kyiv
Ukrainian rally co-drivers
Ukrainian sports journalists
Ukrainian association football commentators